The Bodiontici or Brodiontii were a Gallic tribe dwelling around present-day Digne (Alpes-de-Haute-Provence) during the Roman period.

Name 
They are mentioned as Bodionticos by Pliny (1st c. AD). Possible variants are also attested as Brodionti(i), Bodionio and Bodi(ontio?)  on inscriptions.

The ethnic name Bodiontici appears to derive from the Gaulish stem bodio- ('blond') attached to -ont-ici.

Geography 
The Bodiontici dwelled around present-day Digne, in the valley of the Bléone river. Their territory was located north of the Sentii, south of the Gallitae, east of the Sogiontii, and west of the Eguiturii and Nemeturii.

In 69 AD, the territory of the Bodiontici was transferred, along with that of the Avantici, to the province of Gallia Narbonensis by Galba. According to A. L. F. Rivet, this decision "may have been due to the influence of the former provincial governor, T. Vinius Rufus, who effectively controlled Galba and joined him in the consulship in 69."

Their chief town was known as Dinia (present-day Digne; Gaulish Dīniā 'the shelter'). Like the modern settlement, it likely served as a spa town in ancient times. Dinia was transferred to the province of Alpes Maritimae in the Later Empire.

References

Primary sources

Bibliography 

Historical Celtic peoples
Gauls
Tribes of pre-Roman Gaul